Ruhuna Royals  was a franchise cricket team that took part in Sri Lanka Premier League, representing Southern Province. Pearl Overseas Limited purchased the team for $4.6 million in 2012. They was owned for seven years, after which a new agreement may be negotiated.
The team’s current Captain  Shahid Afridi

History
Star Pakistani all-rounder Shahid Afridi joined the franchise as Captain for the 2012 season after leaving Nagenahira Nagas for low payments. Pakistani fast-bowling legend Waqar Younis joined as the head coach of the franchise.

Home ground

Galle International Stadium is a Cricket Stadium in Golden Galle It would be one of oldest venue in world cricket. Capacity 50,000 & beauty of sea & Odd Galle fort as well & 
Mahinda Rajapaksa International Stadium is a cricket stadium in Hambantota, Sri Lanka. It was built for the 2011 Cricket World Cup and hosted two matches, the first being Sri Lanka against Canada, on 20 February 2011. The stadium has a capacity of 34,300 people. The stadium won't be able host any matches for the 2012 edition of the SLPL as it is being renovated up to a capacity of 60,000 for the upcoming 2012 ICC World Twenty20.

Current squad
Coach: Waqar Younis

Players with international caps are listed in bold.

References

External links
Team site on ESPN CricInfo

Sri Lanka Premier League teams
Sports clubs in Sri Lanka
Cricket clubs established in 2012
Sports clubs disestablished in 2012
2012 establishments in Sri Lanka
Cricket in Hambantota
Sport in Hambantota